O.G. Est. 1992 is a mixtape by rapper EDIDON of Outlawz. It was released on May 21, 2013, through O4L Digital & Hoodrich Entertainment.

Track listing

References

External links 
 O-4-L.com Official EDIDON's Website
 
 
 
 

2013 albums
E.D.I. albums
Albums produced by E.D.I.
Albums produced by Drumma Boy